Walter Harry de Voil was Dean of Brechin from 1957 until 1964.

During World War I served with the West Yorkshire Regiment. He was educated at Durham University where he gained a Licentiate of Theology or the Licence in Theology (L.Th.) in 1922. He studied at Edinburgh University where he gained an M.A. in 1923. He was ordained in 1925. His first post was a curacy at St Margaret, Lochee and then Chaplain at St Ninian's Cathedral, Perth. He was then Rector of St John Pittenweem; St Margaret Leven; and Holy Rood Carnoustie. In 1937 he gained a Ph.D. from the University of Edinburgh.

From 1942 to 1949 he was vicar of Elsecar, Yorkshire.

He married Mary Baxter in 1940. He had a son, Dr Cedric Walter Benedict de Voil MBE (b. 1942) and became the legal guardian of Paul Walter de Voil (b. Paul Walter Vogel, 1929), who emigrated from Germany in 1935 and was the son of his friend Paul Heinz Vogel, an Old Catholic priest and bible scholar.

Notes

West Yorkshire Regiment officers
Alumni of Durham University
Scottish Episcopalian clergy
Deans of Brechin
Year of birth missing
Year of death missing